RSA Insurance Group Limited (trading as RSA, formerly RSA Insurance Group plc and Royal and Sun Alliance) is a British multinational general insurance company headquartered in London, England. RSA has major operations in the United Kingdom, Ireland, Scandinavia & Canada. It provides insurance products and services in more than 100 countries through a network of local partners. It has 9 million customers. RSA was formed by the merger of Sun Alliance and Royal Insurance in 1996.

RSA was listed on the London Stock Exchange until it was acquired by Danish insurer Tryg and Canada's Intact Financial Corporation in May 2021. The transaction closed on 1 June 2021.

History
RSA was formed by the merger of Sun Alliance and Royal Insurance in 1996.

On 4 February 2014, it was announced that Stephen Hester, former CEO of RBS Group would become CEO of RSA with immediate effect.

In 2014/15 Hester led a major restructuring of RSA to bolster its finances. Many non-core overseas operations were sold, disposals almost halving the size of the group, with the aim of aligning its strategic focus with its core markets.

In September 2015, RSA divested all its Latin American insurance operations to the Colombian insurance company Grupo Sura for £403 Million.

In November 2020, the company received a £7.2 billion offer from Danish insurer Tryg and Canada's Intact Financial Corporation. This deal is considered one of the biggest takeover bids in Europe in 2020. The transaction closed on 1 June 2021; under the deal, Intact acquired the main international RSA entity as well as its businesses in Canada and the UK, while Tryg took control of RSA's units in Sweden and Norway. Intact and Tryg initially took joint control of RSA's Danish subsidiary Codan Denmark, but shortly thereafter announced plans to sell it to Alm. Brand.

Operations

RSA operates in 28 countries and provides insurance products and services in more than 140 through a global network of local partners. It has over 20 million customers around the world.

RSA is the second-largest general insurer in the United Kingdom. Its global headquarters are in the City of London on 20 Fenchurch Street occupying floors 15-17 of the 'walkie-talkie' building. Its UK registered office is 20 Fenchurch St, London. Other key UK offices are located in Liverpool, Bristol, Manchester, Chelmsford, Glasgow, Cardiff, Sunderland, Belfast, Peterborough, Halifax, Birmingham, and Horsham. RSA, including its "More Than" brand, announced itself to be the first carbon neutral insurance company in the UK on 2 December 2006.

RSA owns the More Than direct car, home, pet and travel insurance brand in the United Kingdom, recognised widely for its former Lucky The Dog advertisements and its "MORE IS ..." campaign. More Than also sells van, business car, shops and offices and business insurance through its More Than Business operation. RSA also owns the CODAN brand in Denmark and Norway, Johnson brand in Canada, 123+ brand in Ireland, Trygg-Hansa brand in Sweden, Al-Alamiya in Saudi Arabia, Al-Ahlia in Oman and the Motability and Insurance Corporation brands in the UK.

Offices

Asia
 Bahrain
 India
 Oman
 Saudi Arabia
 United Arab Emirates

North America and Caribbean
 Canada
 USA

Europe
 United Kingdom
 Ireland
 France
 Germany
 Spain
 Belgium
 Denmark
 Sweden
 Norway

Controversies
Three former RSA Insurance Ireland staff have been fined a combined £182,000 (€206,090) under sanctions tied to an investigation by a UK accounting watchdog into financial irregularities at the firm in 2012.

Asbestos liabilities
In January 2002 Royal & Sun Alliance became involved in litigation over claims for injury arising from asbestosis among workers in Clyde shipyards. The workers alleged that between 1972 and 1977 RSA had issued insurance certificates to asbestos manufacturer Turner & Newall but excluded cover for asbestosis, in breach of the Employers' Liability (Compulsory Insurance) Act 1969. RSA responded that asbestos-related injury was excluded from the policy because it was a risk the company was not willing to underwrite, that Turner & Newall was instead self-insured against asbestosis and should therefore be responsible for any compensation.

In February 2002 RSA set aside £384 million to double its reserves available for asbestos claims which, combined with claims of £215 million arising from the 11 September attacks, wiped out its 2001 profits. RSA put up seven of its subsidiaries for sale in an attempt to raise a further £800 million to cover liabilities for asbestos insurance claims in the United States. Friends Ivory & Sime subsequently acquired RSA's UK asset management subsidiary in May 2002 for £240 million. The situation was further compounded by RSA having to reserve £1.2 billion against liabilities for guaranteed annuities, the product which caused the collapse of Equitable Life, and was also facing a fine from the Financial Services Authority for failure to meet the deadline in the pension mis-selling review. Two months later Friends Provident acquired RSA's offshore life unit International Financial Services Limited, based on the Isle of Man, for £133 million. In July 2002 RSA sold its group risk business to Canada Life for £60 million. RSA was forced to close its life business, with the loss of 1,200 jobs, in August 2002.

In November 2002 Turner & Newall launched a suit against RSA on behalf of former employees who had suffered asbestos-related disease, claiming that the insurer was liable because it provided employer liability policies to the engineering firm. In an effort to reduce costs, RSA chairman Sir Patrick Gillam said it would sell its US business RSUI and "float most of its Asia Pacific operations", bringing total job losses in the UK to 4000. The case was heard at the High Court of Justice in January 2003. RSA argued that a policy clause which excluded cover for pneumoconiosis also excluded other asbestos-related disease such as asbestosis and peritoneal mesothelioma. Colin Edelman QC, representing T&N, told Mr Justice Lawrence Collins that the defence which RSA had the "temerity" to put forward was "just ridiculous" and that the insurer was trying to "wriggle out of its liability". On 9 May 2003 the court ruled that RSA was liable for the compensation claims. In September 2003 RSA cut 1,000 jobs in the UK and asked shareholders for £960 million to cover further asbestos claims.

Inflated repair costs

In September 2011, Judge Platt of the Romford County Court in his judgement attacked the method in which RSA recovered their costs by putting a subsidiary within the motor claims process to inflate profits. Several insurers are now refusing to pay RSA's requests for payment without sight of the original invoice. On 15 June 2012, RSA Insurance was successful in a High Court ruling; the company said the ruling meant "its practices have been deemed legal and its stance vindicated". Within hours, Allianz Insurance lodged an appeal against RSA. Since then RSA has started to make bilateral agreements, the first announced on 29 June 2012 with Cooperative Insurance.

Hillsborough disaster
A fatal event at an English FA Cup match, widely known as the Hillsborough disaster, implicated RSA.  A human crush resulted in 97 fatalities and 766 injured persons. The Royal Sun Alliance Insurance Company (which, as Sun Alliance, was the insurer for Sheffield Wednesday Football Club in 1989) refused to waive its entitlement to privilege, thus denying the Hillsborough Independent Panel access to its material. Strenuous efforts were made to persuade the company to allow the Panel confidential access to the material, but it maintained its refusal. RSA were entitled to do this as they are under no obligation to release information relating to the amount of compensation paid out to victims and families; in any case the release of that information would not have affected the result on who was to blame for the Hillsborough disaster.

See also

 List of companies based in London

References

Further reading

External links

 

Financial services companies established in 1996
Insurance companies of the United Kingdom
Companies formerly listed on the London Stock Exchange
Financial services companies based in the City of London
British companies established in 1996
1996 establishments in England
2021 mergers and acquisitions
Rothschild family
Insurance companies of Canada
Insurance companies of Ireland
British subsidiaries of foreign companies